Buryat or Buriat may refer to:
Buryats, a Mongol people
Buryat language, a Mongolic language
Buryatia, also known as the "Buryat Republic", a federal subject of Russia

Language and nationality disambiguation pages